"Don't Go Near the Water" is a song by American rock band the Beach Boys from their 1971 album Surf's Up. Written by Mike Love and Al Jardine, the song puts an ironic, ecological spin on the traditional Beach Boys beach- and surf- based songs:  instead of enjoying surfing and other fun activities, this time the listener is advised to avoid the water for environmental reasons.

Background and recording
The song was recorded at the same session as "Long Promised Road" and "4th of July", both also recorded for Surf's Up. The lead vocals are by the song's composers, Love and Jardine. According to biographer Peter Ames Carlin, Brian Wilson contributed the dissonant piano part. However, in a 2007 interview, Wilson stated of the song, "Totally Alan’s trip. I was not part of that." Jardine spoke about the song in a 2021 interview:

Unused lyrics for the song mentioned the narrator's father in reference to the water: "I think it killed my dad".

Release
The song was the B-side of the "Surf's Up" single, released on November 8, 1971. It did not chart. Featured as an A-side in New Zealand, it peaked at #21 there. It was later released on November 2, 1981 as the B-side of the "Come Go with Me" single. The single charted at #18 in the U.S. but never charted in the UK.

Personnel
Credits from Craig Slowinski

The Beach Boys
 Al Jardine - co-lead and backing vocals, tack piano, electric guitars (fed through a Moog), banjos
 Bruce Johnston - backing vocals
 Mike Love - lead and backing vocals
 Brian Wilson - co-lead and backing vocals, harmonica, harmonium, Baldwin organ
 Carl Wilson - backing vocals, electric lead guitar, tambourine; possible guiro

Session musicians
 Daryl Dragon - grand piano, Moog synthesizer, electric rhythm guitar, bass guitar
 Mike Kowalski - drums; possible guiro

References

Works cited

External links
 
 
 

1971 songs
The Beach Boys songs
Songs written by Al Jardine
Songs written by Mike Love
Song recordings produced by the Beach Boys
Environmental songs